The Rec Room is a Canadian chain of entertainment restaurants owned by Cineplex Entertainment. It first opened in Edmonton in 2016 and its locations feature entertainment and recreational attractions such as an arcade, driving simulators; recreational games such as darts, bowling, archery, and virtual reality; as well as restaurants and bars, and an auditorium with a cinema-style screen, which can be used for concerts and other live events.

History 
In January 2015, Cineplex Entertainment announced the establishment of The Rec Room as a brand-new concept, with initial locations set for Calgary's Deerfoot City, South Edmonton Common, and Roundhouse Park in Toronto. Cineplex CEO Ellis Jacob explained that the chain was meant to help the company diversify beyond its core cinema business in the wake of the growing streaming industry.

The first location opened in South Edmonton Common in 2016. A second location at Roundhouse Park opened in June 2017, along with a second Edmonton location at West Edmonton Mall. 

Cineplex aimed to open 10-15 locations of The Rec Room nationally, ranging in size from 30,000 to 50,000 square feet. The company subsequently announced and opened other locations, including Masonville Place in London, Square One Shopping Centre in Mississauga (replacing parts of the former Target Canada store), Avalon Mall in St. Johns, Seasons of Tuxedo in Winnipeg, and Brentwood Town Centre in Burnaby. In May 2019, Cineplex announced a second Vancouver-area location on Granville Street to open in 2021, featuring a rooftop patio.

The Toronto location features The Void virtual reality attraction. In July 2018, Cineplex announced that it would become the exclusive Canadian franchisee of The Void and add additional locations (such as the Mississauga and West Edmonton Mall locations).

Locations 

 Alberta
 Deerfoot, Calgary
 South Edmonton, Edmonton
 West Edmonton Mall, Edmonton
 British Columbia
 Brentwood Town Centre, Burnaby
 Manitoba
 Seasons of Tuxedo, Winnipeg
 Newfoundland and Labrador
 Avalon Mall, St. John's
 Ontario
 Masonville, London
 Park Place, Barrie
 Roundhouse Park, Toronto
 Square One Shopping Centre, Mississauga

See also 
 Dave & Buster's
 Player One Amusement Group

References 

Cineplex Entertainment
Restaurants established in 2016
Entertainment companies of Canada
Video arcades
Regional restaurant chains in Canada
2016 establishments in Alberta
Restaurants in Alberta
Restaurants in Manitoba
Restaurants in British Columbia
Restaurants in Newfoundland and Labrador
Restaurants in Toronto
Restaurants in Ontario